Samuels Field  is a public use airport located two nautical miles (3.7 km) west of the central business district of Bardstown, a city in Nelson County, Kentucky, United States.  This airport is included in the FAA's National Plan of Integrated Airport Systems for 2009–2013, which categorized it as a general aviation facility.

The airport is run by the Bardstown-Nelson County Air Board, which consists six members: half appointed by Bardstown and half by Nelson County.

Facilities and aircraft
It has one runway designated 3/21 with an asphalt surface measuring 5,003 by 75 feet (1,525 x 23 m).

For the 12-month period ending May 19, 2010, the airport had 10,485 aircraft operations, an average of 28 per day: 96% general aviation, 3% air taxi, and 1% military.
At that time there were 25 aircraft based at this airport: 76% single-engine, 4% multi-engine, 4% jet, 4% helicopter and 12% glider.

References

External links
 Bluegrass Aviation, the fixed-base operator
 Aerial image as of 8 March 1997 from USGS The National Map
 
 

Airports in Kentucky
Buildings and structures in Nelson County, Kentucky
Transportation in Nelson County, Kentucky